Piramidy is a rural locality (a selo) in Karaychevskoye Rural Settlement, Buturlinovsky District, Voronezh Oblast, Russia. The population was 84 as of 2010. There are 2 streets.

Geography 
Piramidy is located 25 km west of Buturlinovka (the district's administrative centre) by road. Alekseyevsky is the nearest rural locality.

References 

Rural localities in Buturlinovsky District